Abdul Rahman Hilmi (died 1805) was a Turkish calligrapher.

Life and career
Abdul Rahman Hilmi was pupil of Egrikapili Mehmed Rasim Efendi. He was an adroit calligrapher, known for the firmness of his writing. He spent most of life in Hagia Sophia school in Istanbul studying calligraphy and training students.  

Hilmi was remembered as a very moral and praiseworthy person. He died in 1220/1805 and was buried in Scutari, in the vicinity of another great calligrapher, Sheikh Hamdullah.

See also
 Calligraphy
 Culture of the Ottoman Empire
 Islamic calligraphy
 List of Ottoman calligraphers
 Ottoman art

References 

Calligraphers from the Ottoman Empire
1805 deaths
Year of birth missing
Place of birth missing
18th-century artists from the Ottoman Empire